University Prep (known as UPrep, formerly University Preparatory Academy) is a private, co-educational middle and high school in Wedgwood, Seattle, Washington, United States. As of 2020, school review website Niche ranks University Prep as the fifth best private high school, fifth best college prep private high school, and fourteenth best high school for STEM in Washington state. The mascot is the Puma, with a current student paid to wear the suit for sports games, open houses, and other school events.

History 

University Prep was founded in 1976 by a small group of Seattle Public Schools teachers dedicated to providing the best possible education to a heterogeneous student body. From 2002 to 2014, the head of school of University Prep was Erica L. Hamlin. From 2014 to 2019, the head of school was Matt Levinson. The temporary head of school for the 2019-2020 school year was Lila Lohr. The current head of school Veronica Codrington-Cazeau began to serve as head on school on July 1, 2020.

Curriculum 
The school year is organized into two semesters and four quarters, and students are expected to carry a minimum of five classes each semester. School hours are 8:25 a.m. to 2:55 p.m. for upper school and 8:15 a.m. to 2:55 p.m. for middle school, after which athletics, activities, and after-school programs begin. In addition to academic classes, the day includes electives, physical education, supervised study, and free periods for Upper School students. The school transitioned from a Moodle education software client to a Schoology-based learning management system. In Middle School, all students have personal iPads. In Upper School, students may choose either a Windows or Apple computer. In most cases, students are given the option to complete an assignment digitally or on paper. All classes, excluding Physical Education and fine arts classes, are honors level.

Sports 
University Prep competes at the 1A state classification level for sports. 
The 2010-2011 school year marked the change of the old sports system. Before that academic year, the Upper School had the same athletics program as the Middle School with the exception of having tennis. Boys soccer was moved to the spring season to bring a more competitive level of play for the teams and various other reasons. To counter the absence of boys soccer in the fall, boys tennis was added to the fall athletics season.

Campus 
University Prep's campus has three main buildings: the three-story classroom and administrative building (including a library, cafeteria, science classrooms, and meeting spaces), a classroom building, a gymnasium, and the fine arts center (part of the classroom and administrative building), which features a proscenium theater known as Founder's Hall as well as art and practice rooms. The adjacent Dahl Playfield is used for sports and other activities.

Notable alumni 
 Sam Cho, politician and entrepreneur
 Justin Kan, internet entrepreneur and investor
 Benjamin Mako Hill, technologist and author
 Katherine Reynolds, professional soccer player
 Emi Meyer, jazz pianist and singer-songwriter
 Rob Johnson, politician

References

External links 
 

Wedgwood, Seattle
Schools in Seattle
High schools in King County, Washington
Preparatory schools in Washington (state)
Private middle schools in Washington (state)
Private high schools in Washington (state)
Educational institutions established in 1976
1976 establishments in Washington (state)